Stanley Patrick Evelyn Simon (14 March 1920 – 22 May 2008) was a veteran English Master of Wine, wine-merchant and writer on wine.

Career
After six years at Gresham's School, Holt (1931–1937), and military service during the Second World War, Simon entered the wine trade in 1948, importing wines chiefly from France,  Germany, Italy, and Portugal, but later also from Spain, South Africa, Australia and the United States. Going into business on his own account as an importer and wholesaler of wines (trading as Pat Simon Wines Ltd), by 1969 he rose to the rank of Master of Wine of the Institute of Masters of Wine and also became a frequent contributor to specialist periodicals.

Simon's book Wine-tasters' Logic (2000) distils the experiences of fifty years of wine-tasting and is also full of anecdotes of the wine trade of long ago. The first part of the book discusses the concepts behind wine-tasting, exploring areas like aroma, balance, finish, and tannin. The second part contains details on, choice of glasses and instructions for decanting wine correctly.

Publications
Wine-tasters' Logic (Mitchell Beazley, London, 2000) 
Wine-tasters' Logic (Faber & Faber Paperbacks, London, 2001)

See also
List of wine personalities

References

External links
Circle of Wine Writers (accessed 8 September 2007)
Pat Simon Wines Ltd (accessed 8 September 2007)
Masters of Wine (accessed 8 September 2007)
Wine-tasters' Logic at wineanorak.com (accessed 8 September 2007)

1920 births
2008 deaths
Masters of Wine
People educated at Gresham's School